Gareth Broderick Morgan (born April 12, 1996) is a Canadian professional baseball outfielder in the Los Angeles Angels organization.

Career 
Born and raised in Toronto, Ontario, Morgan has also played on the Canadian junior national team, becoming the youngest player to do so, as he joined the team at age 14.

He became the youngest player to participate in the Under Armour All-American Game powered by Baseball Factory in 2011 and the first Canadian to play in the Perfect Game All-American Game. The 2013 game was played at Petco Park in San Diego, California.

He began training with former Olympic sprinter Ben Johnson in 2013.

He was drafted by the Seattle Mariners with the 74th overall pick in the 2014 Major League Baseball draft. He signed with Seattle and was assigned to the AZL Mariners where he batted .148 with two home runs and 12 RBIs in 45 games. Morgan returned to the Mariners in 2015 and posted a .225 batting average with five home runs and 30 RBIs in 55 games.

In 2016, Morgan played in 38 total games between the AZL Mariners and the Bakersfield Blaze, posting a combined .232 average with one home run and 15 RBIs. He spent all of 2017 with the Clinton LumberKings where he batted .230 with a career high 17 home runs and 61 RBIs along with a .743 OPS. He was released by the Mariners organization on April 19, 2019.  He signed with the LA Angels April 2019.

International career
Morgan was selected for the Canada national baseball team at the 2015 WBSC Premier12 and 2019 WBSC Premier12.

References

External links

1996 births
Living people
Arizona League Mariners players
Bakersfield Blaze players
Baseball outfielders
Baseball players from Toronto
Black Canadian baseball players
Canada national baseball team players
Canadian expatriate baseball players in the United States
Clinton LumberKings players
Inland Empire 66ers of San Bernardino players
Mobile BayBears players
Modesto Nuts players
2015 WBSC Premier12 players
2019 WBSC Premier12 players